Rhabdalestes leleupi is a species of fish in the family Alestidae. It is found in Kenya and Tanzania. Its natural habitats are rivers and freshwater lakes.

The fish is named in honor of entomologist Narcisse Leleup (1912-2001), with the Institut pour la Recherche Scientifique en Afrique Centrale, who helped collect the type specimen.

References

Sources

Rhabdalestes
Fish described in 1967
Taxa named by Max Poll
Taxonomy articles created by Polbot